Kalle Koblet (born 17 August 1997) is a Swiss snowboarder. He competed in the 2018 Winter Olympics.

References

1997 births
Living people
Snowboarders at the 2018 Winter Olympics
Snowboarders at the 2022 Winter Olympics
Swiss male snowboarders
Olympic snowboarders of Switzerland
21st-century Swiss people